P. cookei may refer to:

 Phacelia cookei, a plant in the family Boraginaceae, endemic to California
 Plesiadapis cookei, an extinct primate
 Pseudocellus cookei, an arachnid in the family Ricinoididae, native to Guatemala
 Psychotria cookei, a plant in the family Rubiaceae, endemic to French Polynesia